Belarus competed at the 2011 World Championships in Athletics from August 27 to September 4 in Daegu, South Korea.

Team selection

A team of 23 athletes was
announced to represent the country
in the event.

The following athletes appeared on the preliminary Entry List,
but not on the Official Start List of the specific event, resulting in total number of 22 competitors:

Medalists
The following Belorussian competitors won medals at the Championships

Results

Men

Women

References

External links
Official local organising committee website
Official IAAF competition website

Nations at the 2011 World Championships in Athletics
World Championships in Athletics
Belarus at the World Championships in Athletics